John G. "Jack" Scheible (February 16, 1866 – August 6, 1897) was a professional baseball player who pitched for two different teams over two seasons. He made his debut in 1893 with the Cleveland Spiders and played for the Philadelphia Phillies the following year.

He was born in the village of Brier Hill, now part of Youngstown, Ohio, an industrial town located near the Pennsylvania border.

Amateur and professional career
Scheible's obituary in The Youngstown Telegram says that he was employed at a local flour mill before he began playing ball with minor league teams affiliated with the Tri-State League, Iron & Oil League, and New England League.

In the early 1890s, he broke into the National League.

Later years
Upon his retirement from the National League, Scheible returned to Youngstown, where he continued to play amateur and semi-professional ball. He contracted pneumonia shortly after being hired to pitch for a game in Erie, Pennsylvania. Scheible became aware of his condition as he was about to board a train to Erie. He was rushed to Mahoning County Hospital, where he died a few days later.

Scheible's obituary states that he was survived by his father, John Sr., three sisters, Elizabeth and Katherine Scheible and Mrs. Mary Miller, and brothers Charles and William.  (His surviving brother Charles became mayor of Youngstown in the early 1920s.)

The newspaper article described Jack Scheible in the following terms: "As a ballplayer he was a determined person and as a citizen always sociable, quiet and unassuming".

References

External links
 Baseball Almanac Player Page
 1894 Philadelphia Phillies Roster

1866 births
1897 deaths
Cleveland Spiders players
Philadelphia Phillies players
Baseball players from Youngstown, Ohio
19th-century baseball players
Sterling (minor league baseball) players
Galesburg (minor league baseball) players
Burlington (minor league baseball) players
Youngstown Giants players
Springfield, Ohio (minor league baseball) players
Altoona Mud Turtles players
Milwaukee Brewers (minor league) players
Altoona Mad Turtles players
Lancaster Chicks players
Bridgeton (minor league baseball) players
Reading Actives players
New Bedford Whalers (baseball) players
New Bedford Browns players
Youngstown Puddlers players
Minor league baseball managers
Deaths from pneumonia in Ohio